Daniel Malik (born Daniel Chaudhry, March 31, 1992), formerly known as Wahab Chaudhry, is a Canadian actor and model known for being the voice of the character Black Philip in The Witch. 

This role, his first feature film, got him nominated for best villain at the Seattle Film Critics Awards in 2017 and Funko made a Pop! collectible of his character. Malik believes one of the reasons he got the role was that director Robert Eggers had a sketch book of how he thought the movie should look and his drawings for the Black Phillip character looked exactly like Malik, whom he had never met. 

Malik has gone on to act in seasons two and four of The Expanse, coming back for a second season as a new character because of fan support.

Malik, whose father emigrated from Pakistan to Canada, was born in Toronto, Ontario. Early in his modelling career, he met Canadian designer Hussein Dhalla who got him involved in Toronto Men's Fashion Week as their first South Asian male runway model.

Malik was born with the name Daniel Chaudhry, but an uncle didn't like the name Daniel, so Wahab Chaudhry became his given legal name which was the name he modeled under. His earliest acting work was under the name Daniel Chaudhry, and for Mother's Day 2019 he took his mother's name and is known as Daniel Malik.

References

External links 
 Daniel Malik on IMDb

1992 births
Living people
Canadian male film actors
Canadian male models
Canadian actors of Pakistani descent